The Manila Railroad 160 class was a class of four Double Mogul Kitson-Meyer Pannier tank locomotives. It was the only articulated locomotive in service with the Manila Railway and the succeeding Manila Railroad, both predecessors to the Philippine National Railways. The class was built in 1914 for mixed services on the steep Antipolo line, and were transferred to the South Main Line to Lucena, Quezon and Pagsanjan, Laguna by 1917. After their controversial run, the locomotives were retired in 1925, shortly after the arrival of their replacements such as the Manila Railroad 200 class.

Background

The Antipolo line was a suburban rail line from Tutuban station to Antipolo, formerly located in the Province of Manila and now the capital of Rizal. It was known for its steep gradient and would require special rolling stock for the line's operations. The Manila Railway as a result ordered tank locomotives from Kitson and Company. The company was known during its time as the provider of Meyer locomotives for South American railroads, which was pioneered by the Anglo-Chilean Nitrate and Railway Company.

At the same time, another Manila Railway 160 class was being ordered from the North British Locomotive Company. Initially, the Kitson-Meyer class was given the 140 class designation while these are being built in the Kitson factory. However, with the start of World War I during the time it was constructed, the difficulty of transportation to the Philippines made the Manila Railway to cancel its order. Instead of having seven 4-6-4 tank locomotives for mainline services, the 160 class was reassigned to the new Kitson-Meyers and the old 160s were reclassified as the South African Class K.

It will be the last locomotive class ordered by the company from Britain although it will not be the last tank locomotive to enter service, as the Manila Railway also entered the Swiss/German-built 300-class rack tanks into service sometime within that year.

Design
The 160 class was the only articulated locomotive that entered service in the Manila Railway and the Manila Railroad being the former's successor, although there were other railroad operators in the Philippines that also operated such types, mostly 0-6-6-0 tender Mallets. It was also the first Kitson-Meyer class in Asia, with the Double Prairie-type Indian class TD entering service on the Kalka–Shimla railway in 1928 and later served the Kangra Valley Railway in Pakistan. It was also the only four of their kind on the Far East with other Southeast and East Asian railroads preferring other types of articulated locomotives. For example, the meter-gauge Royal State Railways of Siam and Burma Railway Company operated Garratts. Meanwhile, the Cape gauge Staatsspoorwegen of the Dutch East Indies (now Indonesian Kereta Api Indonesia) operated Mallets.

The design of the locomotives were based on the 0-6-0+0-6-0 Kitson Meyer class of superheated locomotives that ran on 3 ft gauge railways of the Ferrocarriles Nacionales de Colombia. The 160 class however used the wider  Cape gauge. Each locomotive costed ₱71,000 which is equivalent to US$923,000 in 2020 dollars. The succeeding classes were only heavier in overall weight because of its accompanying tenders.

Its most notable feature of the 160 class was its boxed-shape chassis similar to that of a pannier tank locomotive. However, the fuel compartment is located at its rear end like traditional ones. There were also no nameplates on the locomotives as none of the quartet was named. They instead had the Manila Railway monogram on the side tanks. The design also had 3 different tube sizes, reflecting the Colombian locomotive the class was based on.

Planned expansion
According to Tuffnell (1986), locomotive superintendent R. D. Deacon stated that the Manila Railway planned to order an additional four 2-6-2+2-6-2 Double Prairie-type Kitson-Meyers to the fleet if their operations in the Philippines were successful. These were meant to serve the Aringay–Baguio branch of the North Main Line to the Cordillera Mountains in northern Luzon alongside the 300 class of 0-8-0T cog locomotives and Mirador, a named 0-6-0T of the same purpose. However, the line was never completed and the locomotives were negatively received during its operations.

Service
The four 160 class locomotives were introduced on the Antipolo branch of the South Main Line in 1914. This line started on a wye junction near Santa Mesa station in Manila and ended in Antipolo, Rizal with an extension to Montalban. Unlike the locomotives themselves, the line was partially rebuilt to Guadalupe station in Mandaluyong during the Philippine National Railways era. It carried both passengers and freight on the steep gradients of the line. After the line was closed in 1917 due to low ridership and an order of the Supreme Court, the 160 class was then transferred to the trunk of the South Main Line. During this time, the line terminated in Lucena, Quezon. They also served on a branch line leading to Pagsanjan, Laguna.

Retirement
The locomotives' entire run was plagued with negative reception and controversy. According to a 1916 Supreme Court ruling, the locomotives earned 'three strikes': the 160 class were inefficient, expensive to maintain, and ran very slowly.

The locomotives' massive weight contributed to the locomotives consuming more fuel than what is needed for efficient runs. The Antipolo line's design also did not allow trains to run at higher speeds and the line suffered low ridership as a result. The delivery problem itself already made the Manila Railway to cancel the previous 160 class of 4-6-4Ts and their transfer to South Africa.

The succeeding Manila Railroad also ordered its own rolling stock for the South Main Line. By the late 1910s, they started purchasing only tender locomotives from American manufacturers. The Porter-built 45-class locomotives were introduced on both North and the South Main Line services by 1919. The American Locomotive Company also provided the 170 and 200 classes in 1922, both being the largest passenger and freight locomotives in the MRR, respectively. The new American classes were acclaimed by the local railroad engineers due to their speed and efficiency. Shortly after these newer locomotives entered into service by 1925, the 160 class was retired and scrapped.

Legacy
A 160 class locomotive was featured in the cover of urban planner Arturo G. Corpuz's 1989 book, The Colonial Iron Horse: Railroads and Regional Development in the Philippines, 1875-1935.

Note
  Even though the reorganization from the Manila Railway into the Manila Railroad was not finalized until 1916, the locomotives already bore the "Manila Railroad" name on their nameplates.

References

Rolling stock of the Philippines
3 ft 6 in gauge locomotives
Railway locomotives introduced in 1914
Meyer locomotives
Scrapped locomotives
2-6-0+0-6-2 locomotives
Kitson locomotives